Andy May (born 2 September 1989) is a former Luxembourger international footballer who last played for US Mondorf-les-Bains, as a midfielder.

Career
May has played club football for CS Sanem and FC Differdange 03.

He made his senior international debut for Luxembourg in 2013.

References

1989 births
Living people
Luxembourgian footballers
Luxembourg international footballers
Association football midfielders
FC Differdange 03 players